American counter-terrorism analysts justified the continued extrajudicial detention of many Guantanamo captives because they were suspected of staying in al-Qaeda safe houses, or guest houses—or because names matching theirs, or their "known alias" were found in the suspect houses.

Claims nuclear blueprints were found in a Kabul safehouse
During a November 15, 2001, press briefing by Spencer Abraham, Secretary of Energy, and Tom Ridge, Director of Homeland Security Ridge confirmed a report published by The Times that the U.S. had captured nuclear blueprints in an al Qaeda guest house in Kabul.
Ridge stated that the capture of the nuclear blueprints in this al-Qaeda guesthouse was consistent with Osama bin Laden's plans to become a nuclear threat.

David Rohde, writing for The New York Times News Service, reported on November 17, 2001, that in addition to nuclear plans, safe houses contained flight simulator programs, documents about the handling of biological and chemical weapons, and information about flight training schools in Florida.

CNN claimed to have found and gone through the Kabul safe house used by Abu Khabbab, who they described as "Osama bin Laden's top chemical and biological weapons commander."
CNN hired the Institute for Science and International Security to examine the documents they found, and its president, David Albright, confirmed the abandoned documents included plans for a nuclear bomb, and extensive training notes on the handling of radiological material.

The Combatting Terrorism Center reported that Abu Hafs al Masri (aka Mohammed Atef), al Qaida's military chief, was killed in an air strike on an "al Qa'ida safehouse" in Kabul, in November 2001.

Alleged to have stayed in Kabul safe houses associated with the Taliban or al-Qaeda
American counter-terrorism analysts called many of the houses "safe houses", even when the captives stayed in these houses during the time the Taliban was in power.
Individuals alleged to have stayed in Kabul safe houses associated with the Taliban or al Qaeda include:
Musa Ali Said Al Said Al Umari,
Ridouane Khalid
Abd Al Rahman Al Zahri
Mamdouh Habib.

Alleged to have stayed in Kabul guest houses that had ties to terrorism
Intelligence analysts described a number of other individuals as having stayed in Kabul guest houses tied to terrorism, without an explicit tie to either the Taliban or al Qaeda:
Muaz Hamza Ahmad Al Alawi 
Faruq Ali Ahmed
Samir Naji Al Hasan Moqbel
Mohammad Ahmed Abdullah Saleh Al Hanashi
Abdul Rahman Ma Ath Thafir Al Amri
Atag Ali Abdoh Al-Haj> 
Djamel Ameziane
Abd Al Hadio Omar Mahmoud Faraj
Bessam Muhammed Saleh Al Dubaikey 
Abdallah Tohtasinovich Magrupov 
Abdul Khaled Ahmed Sahleh Al Bedani
Abdullah Mohammad Khan 
Adel Noori
Ayoub Murshid Ali Saleh 
Mohammed Yacoub.

Alleged to have stayed in Kabul houses, without any explicit allegation of ties to terrorism
Some Guantanamo captives faced the allegation that they stayed in Afghan guest houses that were not explicitly tied to terrorism.  They include:
Arkin Mahmud 
Issam Hamid Al Bin Ali Al Jayfi
Richard Belmar 
Shawki Awad Balzuhair.

Managers of suspect guest houses
Some Guantanamo captives were alleged to have managed guest houses or safe houses on behalf of the Taliban, al Qaeda, or other organizations American counter-terrorism analysts asserted had ties to terrorism.

|-
| 342 || Mohammed Mubarek Salah Al Qurbi ||
One of the allegations on the Summary of Evidence memo prepared for his Combatant Status Review Tribunal was:
{|
|
"The detainee served as the manager of the "Al Qaida frontline's guesthouse in Kabul", Afghanistan."
|}
|-
| 10017 || Abu Faraj al-Libbi || 
One of the allegations on the Summary of Evidence memo prepared for his Combatant Status Review Tribunal was:
{|
|
"A Federal Bureau of Investigation source stated he met the detainee in July–August 2001 at the al Qaida guest house in Kabul, Afghanistan. The same source also stated the detainee managed the guest house, and the guest house also served as the Kabul communications hub for Al-Qaida."
|}
|-
| 10025 || Abd al-Hadi al-Iraqi ||
During his 2005 annual review Sa id Salih Sa id Nashir faced the following allegations:
{| class="wikitable" border="1"
|
The detainee worked as a guard at the Kandahar airport from 12 September 2001 until sometime in November 2001.  The detainee identified a man who was a group leader of about 10 people at the airport area in Kandahaar.
 The airport group leader is an al Qaeda leader, a veteran Afghan fighter and head of the Kabul, Afghanistan guesthouse named Khan Ghulam Bashah.
|}
During his 2005 annual review Mohammad Ahmed Abdullah Saleh Al Hanashi faced the allegations that:
{| class="wikitable" border="1"
|
Abd al-Hadi al-Iraqi was a veteran Afghan fighter who was the head of the Kabul, Afghanistan guesthouse named Khan Ghulam Bashah and who later took charge of the Northern front in Kabul in 2000.
|}
During his 2006 annual review Mohammad Ahmed Abdullah Saleh Al Hanashi faced the allegations that:
{| class="wikitable" border="1"
|
Upon the detainee's arrival in Kabul, the detainee stayed in another Taliban house called Darol Alaman House, where he became aware that he would be fighting against the Northern Alliance.
While fighting for the Taliban, the detainee was under the leadership of Abdul Salam and saw Abdul Hadi Al Araqi whom the detainee describes as the General of the non Afghan Taliban troops positioned on the front line.
|}
 Abdul al Hadi Al-Iraqi was transferred to Guantanamo from CIA custody in 2007.  Abdul al Hadi Al-Iraqi, and the six other captives transferred to Guantanamo in 2007 and 2008 have not had Combatant Status Review Tribunals or Administrative Review Board hearings.
|}

References

Al-Qaeda facilities